The Ship is a pub at 3 Hart Street, Aldgate, London EC3.

It is a Grade II listed building, built in 1887.

References

External links
 
 

Grade II listed pubs in the City of London